The SATA Rallye Açores was the fourth round of the 2013 European Rally Championship. The stages were gravel.

Results

Special stages

References 

Azores
Rally Azores
Rallye Açores